A bascule bridge (also referred to as a drawbridge or a lifting bridge) is a moveable bridge with a counterweight that continuously balances a span, or leaf, throughout its upward swing to provide clearance for boat traffic. It may be single- or double-leafed.

The name comes from the French term for balance scale, which employs the same principle. Bascule bridges are the most common type of movable span because they open quickly and require relatively little energy to operate, while providing the possibility for unlimited vertical clearance for marine traffic.

History
Bascule bridges have been in use since ancient times, but until the adoption of steam power in the 1850s, very long, heavy spans could not be moved quickly enough for practical application.

Types

There are three types of bascule bridge and the counterweights to the span may be located above or below the bridge deck.

The fixed-trunnion (sometimes a "Chicago" bascule) rotates around a large axle that raises the span(s). The Chicago bascule name derives from the location where it is widely used, and is a refinement by Joseph Strauss of the fixed-trunnion.

The  trunnion (sometimes a "Scherzer" rolling lift), raises the span by rolling on a track resembling a rocking-chair base. The "Scherzer" rolling lift is a refinement patented in 1893 by American engineer William Donald Scherzer.

The rarer Rall type combines rolling lift with longitudinal motion on trunnions when opening. It was patented (1901) by Theodor Rall. One of the few surviving examples is the Broadway Bridge (1913), in Portland, Oregon.

See also

 Double-beam drawbridge
 Drawbridge
 Johnson Street Bridge
 List of bascule bridges
 Moveable bridges for a list of other movable bridge types
 Straussbrug

References

External links 
 

 
Bridges by structural type